The Watertown Historical Society is a nonprofit organization dedicated to preserving the social, commercial and cultural heritage of Watertown, Connecticut, and the surrounding Litchfield County, Connecticut. Through its museum, historic house tours, lecture series and archival collection, the society has traced and recorded the history of its region from the pre-Columbian period through the present day. 
 
The society and its president, Jeffrey S. Grenier, have received state and national honors for their work in digitizing an archive of historic local publications from fragile newspapers and obsolete microfilm spools.

References

External links 
Watertown Historical Society
Town Times coverage of award-winning newspaper digitizing project
Town Times coverage of the Watertown Historical Society's preservation efforts

History of New England
Watertown, Connecticut
Historical societies in Connecticut
Museums in Litchfield County, Connecticut
Historical society museums in Connecticut